Kim Jong-man is the name of:

Kim Jong-man
Kim Jong-man (footballer, born 1960s)
Kim Jong-man (footballer, born 1972)